Rubén Reig Conejero (born 29 September 1986 in Sax, Alicante) is a Spanish racing cyclist.

References

1986 births
Living people
Spanish male cyclists
People from Alto Vinalopó
Sportspeople from the Province of Alicante
Cyclists from the Valencian Community